The Lycoming O-235 is a family of four-cylinder, air-cooled, horizontally opposed piston aircraft engines that produce , derived from the earlier O-233 engine.

Well-known designs that use versions of the O-235 included the Cessna 152, Grumman American AA-1 series, Beechcraft Model 77 Skipper, Piper PA-38 Tomahawk, American Champion Citabria, Piper Clipper, and the Piper PA-22-108 Colt.

Development
The engines are all carburetor-equipped, feature dual magneto ignition and have a displacement of 233 cubic inches (3.82 L). The first O-235 model was certified on 11 February 1942.

The O-235 was developed into the lighter-weight Lycoming IO-233 engine for light sport aircraft.

Variants

O-235-C1
Power  at 2800 rpm, dry weight  Provision for dual pump drives, tractor and pusher installation.
O-235-C1A
Power  at 2450 rpm, dry weight  Similar to O-235-C1 except ignition timing, lower rpm and power. Optional 2 position or automatic propeller governor drive.
O-235-C1B
Power  at 2800 rpm, dry weight  Similar to O-235-C1 except with retarded breaker magnetos.
O-235-C1C
Power  at 2600 rpm, dry weight  Similar to O-235-C1 except with Slick magnetos.
O-235-C2A
Power  at 2800 rpm, dry weight  Similar to O-235-C1 except with a type 1 propeller flange.
O-235-C2B
Power  at 2800 rpm, dry weight  Similar to O-235-C2A but with two S-1200 series magnetos.
O-235-C2C
Power  at 2600 rpm, alternate rated maximum continuous power rating of 100 hp at 2400 rpm, dry weight  Similar to O-235-C2B except with Slick magnetos and shielded ignition harness.
O-235-E1
Power  at 2800 rpm, dry weight  Similar to O-235-C1 except crankcase and crankshaft supply pressurized oil to a constant speed propeller. Accessory case changed to accommodate a standard propeller governor drive.
O-235-E1B
Power  at 2800 rpm, dry weight  Similar to O-235-E1 except for S4LN-200 series retarded breaker magnetos.
O-235-E2A
Power  at 2800 rpm, dry weight  Similar to O-235-E1 except Type 1 propeller flange.
O-235-E2B
Power  at 2800 rpm, dry weight  Similar to O-235-E2A except incorporates S-1200 series magnetos.
O-235-F1
Power  at 2800 rpm, dry weight  Similar to O-235-C1 except compression ratio, fuel grade and rating.
O-235-F1B
Power  at 2800 rpm, dry weight  Similar to O-235-F1 except retarded breaker magnetos.
O-235-F2A
Power  at 2800 rpm, dry weight  Similar to O-235-F1 except a Type 1 propeller flange.
O-235-F2B
Power  at 2800 rpm, dry weight  Similar to O-235-F2A but with S-1200 series magnetos.
O-235-G1
Power  at 2800 rpm, dry weight  Similar to O-235-F1 except provisions for using constant speed propeller.
O-235-G1B
Power  at 2800 rpm, dry weight  Similar to O-235-G1 except has retarded breaker magnetos.
O-235-G2A
Power  at 2800 rpm, dry weight  Similar to O-235-G1 except a Type 1 propeller flange.
O-235-G2B
Power  at 2800 rpm, dry weight  Similar to O-235-G2A except S-1200 series magnetos.
O-235-H2C
Power  at 2600 rpm, alternate rated maximum continuous power rating of 100 hp at 2400 rpm, dry weight  Similar to O-235-C2C except Type 1 dynafocal mounting.
O-235-J2A
Power  at 2800 rpm, dry weight  Similar to O-235-J2B except magnetos.
O-235-J2B
Power  at 2800 rpm, dry weight  Similar to O-235-F2B except Type 1 dynafocal mounting.
O-235-K2A
Power  at 2800 rpm, dry weight  Similar to O-235-F2A except ignition timing, lower power and reduced compression ratio.
O-235-K2B
Power  at 2800 rpm, dry weight  Similar to O-235-F2B except ignition timing, lower power and reduced compression ratio.
O-235-K2C
Power  at 2700 rpm, dry weight  Similar to O-235-K2A except Slick magnetos.
O-235-L2A
O-235-L2C
O-235-M1
O-235-M2C
O-235-M3C
O-235-N2A
O-235-N2C
O-235-P1
O-235-P2A
O-235-P2C
O-235-P3C

Applications

Specifications (O-235-C2C)

See also

References

External links

 Lycoming 235 Series - Manufacturer's home page

Boxer engines
O-235
1930s aircraft piston engines